Mi Niña Bonita (English: My Pretty Girl) is the single by Chino & Nacho. It is off the album, with the same name, Mi Niña Bonita. This song has two music videos, an original Latin American version and a U.S. version. The official remix features Puerto Rican duo Angel & Khriz.

Music video
The original music video is in a high school. It involves a love interest with Nacho and a girl. The other version is set mainly in a radio station. Both have the hand gesture of the song. Both can be found in Chino & Nacho's VEVO page on YouTube.

Versions and Remixes

Versions
 Mi Niña Bonita (Original Version)
 Mi Niña Bonita (US Version)

Remixes
 Mi Niña Bonita (Urban Remix) (featuring Angel & Khriz)
 Mi Niña Bonita (Dance Remix)
 Mi Niña Bonita (Banda Remix) (featuring Dareyes de la Sierra)
 Mi Nina Bonita (DJ Tigerlily Remix) (featuring Calle da Cristiano Ronaldo 7)

Charts

Weekly charts

Year-end charts

See also
List of number-one Billboard Top Latin Songs of 2010
List of number-one Billboard Hot Tropical Songs of 2010

References

External links
New Version of Music Video
Original Music Video

2009 singles
Chino & Nacho songs
Machete Music singles
2009 songs
Songs with feminist themes